Eleventh Hour is the fifth solo studio album by American hip hop musician Del the Funky Homosapien. It was announced and partially recorded in 2004, but didn't come out until March 11, 2008, when it was released by Definitive Jux. The album is produced by Del himself with additional production from Opio, KU, and J-Zone. It debuted at number 122 on the Billboard 200 chart, selling 5,810 copies in its first week.

Critical reception
At Metacritic, which assigns a weighted average score out of 100 to reviews from mainstream critics, the album received an average score of 69% based on 18 reviews, indicating "generally favorable reviews".

Simon Vozick-Levinson of Entertainment Weekly gave the album a grade of B+, saying: "Funky as ever, the Homosapien manages to evolve yet again, this time by embracing sounds of the past." Nate Patrin of Pitchfork gave the album a 6.8 out of 10, calling it "a straightforward and uncluttered record that flows surprisingly naturally for an album that's been so repeatedly delayed."

Track listing

Charts

References

External links
 

2008 albums
Del the Funky Homosapien albums
Definitive Jux albums
Albums produced by J-Zone